Tessellis S.p.A. (formerly Tiscali S.p.A.) is an Italian telecommunications company founded in 1998 and based in Cagliari, Sardinia, that provides Internet and telecommunications services in Italy, and, previously had operations in other European nations through its acquisition of many smaller European Internet Service Providers (ISPs) in the late 1990s.

History

Tiscali S.p.A. was created in January 1998 in Cagliari by Renato Soru, following the deregulation of Italian telephone system. The company owes its name to a Sardinian mountain at which remains of an ancient village were found. From March 1999 onward, Tiscali offered "Tiscali Free Net", a subscription-free Internet service where customers only had to pay for the time they were online. This pushed other Italian providers to repeal their fixed subscription fees, thus contributing to making the Internet accessible to the masses in Italy.

On 30 December 2021, Tiscali S.p.A. and Linkem S.p.A. approved the project for the merger by incorporation of Linkem Retail S.r.l. in Tiscali S.p.A.

On 27 April 2022, the shareholders' meetings of Tiscali and Linkem approved the merger between the two companies.

On 1 August 2022, the two companies completed the merger process: Tiscali S.p.A. integrated Linkem Retail S.r.l., with the consequent transfer of the branch to the subsidiary Tiscali Italia S.p.A., while Linkem S.p.A. became the majority shareholder of Tiscali S.p.A. (58.60%).

After announcing it in October 2022, on 19 January 2023 the name of the parent company became Tessellis S.p.A., which will continue to operate under both the commercial brands Tiscali and Linkem

IPO
In October 1999 (during the dot-com bubble), the company went through an initial public offering (IPO) to be traded on the Italian Stock Exchange at a share price of 46 Euros. 3,098,000 shares were offered to investors of which 2,658,000 shares were created through a capital increase and the rest were sold by Soru. Soru made 20,240,000 Euros on the IPO. In 2012, the price per share had plummeted to 0.04 Euros.

Between 2001 and 2005, shares were also traded on the French Stock Exchange. It was delisted from Paris Stock Exchange at the end of December 2005.

Sales 

Beginning in 2004, Tiscali sold off many of its regional sub-companies to native telecommunications operators in order to focus more on prime target areas. 
On 16 August 2004, Tiscali sold its Austrian branch, Tiscali Österreich GmbH, to Nextra Telecom GmbH.
On 20 August 2004, Tiscali sold its South African branch, Tiscali (Pty) Ltd, to MWEB Holdings (Pty) Ltd.
On 23 August 2004, Tiscali sold its Norwegian branch, Tiscali AS, to Telenor Telecom Solutions.
On 30 August 2004, Tiscali sold its Swedish counterpart, Tiscali AB, to Spray Network AB, then a subsidiary of Lycos.
On 16 September 2004, Tiscali sold its Swiss counterpart, Tiscali AG, reaching an agreement with Smart Telecom.
On 19 October 2004, Tiscali sold its South African mobile telephone network, Tiscali Mobile, to Vodacom S.A.
On 29 November 2004, Tiscali sold its Luxembourg subsidiary, Tiscali S.A., reaching an agreement with Alternet S.A.
On 29 November 2004, Tiscali sold its Belgian subsidiary, Tiscali N.V, reaching an agreement with Scarlet België.
On 1 February 2005, Tiscali sold its Danish company, Tiscali Denmark A/S, to Tele2.
On 5 May 2005, Tiscali sold the French ISP, Liberty Surf to Telecom Italia.
On 31 January 2007, Tiscali sold its German business to consumer activities to Freenet.de AG, at a sum of €30 million. It later sold its business-to-business transactions on 5 February 2007 to Ecotel Communication AG, with future intentions to leave the German market altogether.
On 19 June 2007, Tiscali sold its Dutch branch, Tiscali BV, to Royal KPN N.V.
On 11 October 2006, Tiscali announced that it was to focus on the UK and Italy as its prime ISP targets, with plans to introduce new services to them including a mobile network operator and new IPTV products to the United Kingdom by its acquisition of HomeChoice.
On 31 December 2008, Tiscali shut down its IPTV service in Italy.
 On 27 May 2009, Tiscali sold its International arm, Tinet to BS Private Equity firm.
On 30 June 2009, Tiscali sold its UK subsidiary to Carphone Warehouse following regulatory approval from the European Union. The service was rebranded as TalkTalk in January 2010.
 By 16 February 2016, Tiscali completed its merger with Aria, an Italian WiMAX provider.

Services

Each of Tiscali's regional companies offer many services, which may include broadband Internet access and telephone services. Between 2007 and 2008, Tiscali briefly operated an IPTV service in Italy (available in the cities of Bologna, Cagliari, Florence, Genoa, Milan, Naples, Palermo, Rome, Turin and Trieste). Its UK television service, Tiscali TV was acquired by TalkTalk in 2009.

Tiscali's former carrier company, Tiscali International Network, was a pure-play carrier business delivering wholesale services including Global IP Connectivity, MPLS lines, Voice over IP and Network Monitoring. In May 2009, its IP/MPLS backbone counted 90 Points of Presence and extended over 17 European countries and across the United States and Hong Kong. Its Autonomous System (AS3257) was a core ASN in the global Internet routing table, as well as the largest IPv6 backbone outside Asia. The network was sold to the Italian private equity firm BS Private Equity SpA on 27 May 2009, and renamed Tinet.

Tiscali ran similar Web portals for each of its countries, which include features such as Webmail, reviews, news, videos, dating, chat, radio, TV guide, streaming TV channels and others.

Tiscali published a self-branded Web browser of the same name which was distributed with its dial-up Internet packages. The browser used the core of Microsoft's Internet Explorer browser to display web pages. Distribution of the software ended during Tiscali's corporate rebranding in 2004.

Tiscali offered dial-up Internet access in Finland under service name Surfeu.

Tiscali Campus in Cagliari had 1,000 employees as of early 2013. The center includes a development division for Internet technologies. Researchers working there included Antonio Tuzzi (one of the developers of Apple's macOS), Luca Manunza (inventor of the first Webmail service), and Domenico Dato (developer of Arianna, the first Italian search engine).

Financial and economic data
On 31 December 2020 it had 530 direct employees, and 5,199,124,915 common shares.
Customers include about 673,000 households and companies.
In 2021 shareholders of Tiscali included Renato Soru (6,08%) and Amsicora S.r.l. (16.65%).

See also
 Tiscali Italia
 Tiscali International Network
 Tiscali Mobile
 Tiscali TV
 Tiscali UK

References

External links

 

Companies based in Cagliari
Telecommunications companies established in 1998
Internet service providers of Italy
Italian brands
Telecommunications companies of Italy